Erik "Abbi" Asmussen (2 November 1913 – 29 August 1998) was a Danish architect active in Järna, Sweden.

Asmussen was born in Copenhagen, Denmark, and died, aged 84, in Järna, Sweden.

Buildings by Asmussen 

 Kulturhuset i Ytterjärna
 Vidar hospital Ytterjärna

 Kristofferskolan i Bromma, Stockholm
 Örjanskolan i Järna
 Rudolf Steiner Seminariet i Järna

External links 
 Asmussens Arkitektgrupp AB

References 

1913 births
1998 deaths
Architects from Copenhagen
Organic architecture
20th-century Danish architects
Recipients of the Prince Eugen Medal